Brazil–Iran relations are the bilateral relations between the Federative Republic of Brazil and the Islamic Republic of Iran. Relations are characterized by economic and diplomatic cooperation and are quite friendly. Iran has a productive trade balance with Brazil. The two governments signed a document to bolster cooperation during the G-15 Summit in Tehran in 2010. However, since the election of former Brazilian president, Dilma Rousseff, relations between the two countries recently have deteriorated greatly, following Rousseff shifting Brazil away from Iran due to Iran's violation of human and civil rights. Mahmoud Ahmadinejad's media adviser, Ali Akbar Javanfekr, was quoted as stating that Rousseff had "destroyed years of good relations" between them. He denied making such a statement.

The Brazilian population has an overwhelmingly negative view of Iran; in a Pew poll from 2015, just 11% of Brazilians had a favorable opinion of Iran, compared to 79% unfavorable.Gander, Kashmira. "The chart that shows what the world thinks of Iran." The Independent. July 2015.

Although Iran is economically quite significant to Brazil, during the presidency of Jair Bolsonaro since 2019, ties with Iran have diminished. The relationship between the two countries is politically much more remote than before the Bolsonaro era.

Country comparison

Background
Brazil–Iran relations date back to 1903, but showed they could be promising in 1957, upon signature of a cultural agreement, which came into force on December 28, 1962. This agreement also marks the elevation of the Brazilian legation in Tehran to the condition of embassy, in 1961. In 1965, Shah Mohammad Reza Pahlavi visited Brazil. The main reason for this first contact was to promote the Brazilian presence in Iran and the Middle East through books, films, exchange of professors and intellectuals, and plays. The bilateral relation was further strengthened by an agreement that established a commission on economic and technical cooperation in 1975.

The Brazilian government chose to remain neutral during the Iran–Iraq War (1980–1988), despite its strong economic and military relations with Iraq. During the conflict, Brazil provided both sides with training and military equipment. With the end of hostilities, Brazil decided to pursue Iran to sign a memorandum of understanding that would establish a high-level commission between the two countries. Despite these efforts, relations during the 1990s were overshadowed by domestic politics and resulted in a period of distancing between the two countries. This would only change after president Luiz Inácio Lula da Silva took office in 2003.

The Lula da Silva administration sought, during its first years in office, to reestablish Brazil's influence in the Middle East and deepen its relations with the countries in the region. The Middle East became a foreign policy priority, and Iran was viewed as an extremely important partner. This new policy was met with reciprocity in Tehran. The Iranian government has come to define its relations with Latin America as a top priority. Brasília and Tehran established a permanent high-level consultation mechanism, that alternates between their two capitals, and encompass various areas. This allows both governments to have regular talks and consolidates the bilateral relationship.

The change in Iranian leadership, from the reformist Mohammad Khatami to the ultraconservative Mahmoud Ahmadinejad, did not change the Brazilian perspective. Even prior to the election of Ahmadinejad and his subsequent reelection in 2009, bilateral relations had increased significantly. Since 2003, Brazilian state-run oil company Petrobras has been permitted to explore oil reserves in Iran. Between 2003 and 2005, trade with the Middle East increased 47%. Iran became Brazil's second largest importer in the region.

Recent history
In recent years, Brazil has continued to engage in normal diplomatic relations with Iran, despite the international sanctions against Iran's nuclear program. Brasília considers that the International Atomic Energy Agency, not the United Nations Security Council, should resolve the dispute over the program. In September 2007, President Luiz Inácio Lula da Silva stated that "Iran has the right to proceed with peaceful nuclear research and should not be punished just because of Western suspicions it wants to make an atomic bomb," and that "so far, Iran has committed no crime regarding United Nations guidelines on nuclear weapons." The Brazilian government's view was reaffirmed in November 2008 when Foreign Minister Celso Amorim stated that "Brazil does not recognize unilateral sanctions imposed on Iran, whether by the United States or the European Union, [and] the Iranian government should fully cooperate with the agency because it is the best way to avoid sanctions."

In February 2010, there was some speculation that Brazil could have been involved in direct bilateral talks to provide Iran with weapons-grade uranium, which was denied by Brazilian Foreign Minister Celso Amorim. Amorim stated that, "at no time in conversations held with Iran was [uranium] enrichment discussed."

On May 17, 2010, Brazil, Iran and Turkey issued the "Tehran Nuclear Declaration", a joint declaration "in which Iran agreed to send low-enriched uranium to Turkey in return for enriched fuel for a research reactor." Despite receiving considerable support from the international community, the proposal was rebuked by the United States and Israel. The United States dismissed the proposal and announced a "draft accord" among permanent Security Council members for additional sanctions on Iran, designed to pressure it to end its nuclear enrichment program. Turkey and Brazil criticized the sanctions proposal. Brazil's Foreign Minister also expressed frustration with the U.S. stance, saying of Brazil's vote against the sanctions resolution: “We could not have voted in any different way except against.”

The election of Dilma Rousseff as president of Brazil has brought a change to the Brazilian policy towards Iran, leading to a cooling in relations between the two nations. Rousseff harshly criticized the human rights situation in Iran. During her electoral campaign, she stated that women stoning in Iran is "medieval behavior". Brazil has since supported a resolution for nominating a U.N. Special Rapporteur for human rights in Iran, whose eventual report condemned Iranian human rights abuses. In response, Iranian President Ahmadinejad's Media Adviser, Ali Akbar Javanfekr, was quoted as stating that Rousseff had "destroyed years of good relations" between the two countries. He later denied having made that statement.

In April 2012, an Iranian diplomat stationed at the Iranian Embassy in Brazil was accused of molesting young girls between the ages of 9–15 years. The diplomat, Hekmatollah Ghorbani, was caught touching the girls inappropriately by one of the girls' parents at a Brazilian country club's pool in the capital city of Brasília. As one parent told reporters, those at the pool were so infuriated that the diplomat would have been "lynched" had local security not intervened. While many in Brazil were infuriated by these actions, the Iranian Embassy in Brazil stated that "the accusation leveled against the Iranian diplomat is only a misunderstanding arising from differences in cultural attitudes”. The Brazilian Foreign Minister, Antonio Patriota expressed his disgust and dismay at the situation by calling it "unacceptable" and "very disturbing". Invoking his diplomatic immunity, the Iranian Diplomat left Brazil. Upon his return to Iran, the diplomat was discharged by the Iranian Foreign Ministry. In a statement, the Iranian Foreign Ministry explained that "following an investigation into the violations by the Iranian employee of the Iranian Embassy in Brazil, it was confirmed that he had failed to comply with administrative regulations and professional and Islamic moralities."

Ahmadinejad's visit to Rio

There was some controversy over Iran's involvement in the Rio+20 conference. Iran sent a delegation, which included President Ahmadinejad, to Rio de Janeiro to attend the summit. The controversy of Iranian attendance at the summit surrounds the fact that Iran has serious environmental issues, which it has refused to address, continuing human rights violations and is refusing to cooperate with the IAEA over its contentious nuclear program.

The Iranian delegation was met with protesters who waved banners with the slogan “Ahmadinejad go home”. The demonstrators were mostly made up of human rights activists, homosexuals and Jews demonstrating against Iran's violation of human rights and their unresolved environment issues. Several states boycotted Iran through walking out during Ahmadinejad's speech, including Canada. A Canadian representative for the Environment Minister Peter Kent, who led the delegation, said that their walkout was designed to "...send a strong message to Iran, and to the world, that Canada will not tolerate Iran's radical and dangerous rhetoric." Other delegations including the United States, Israel, Australia, the United Kingdom, and the European Union also boycotted the Iranian President's speech.

Brazilian President Dilma Rousseff rejected a meeting request from Iranian President Mahmoud Ahmadinejad. Rio de Janeiro Mayor, Eduardo Paes, also canceled the inauguration of a replica of the famed Persepolis columns offered by Iran. The event had been scheduled with the presence of the Iranian leader.

Relations since 2019 

Brazil-Iran relations have worsened after right-wing Jair Bolsonaro won Brazilian 2018 presidential election. Brazil was one of the few countries to openly back the elimination on Jan. 3, 2020, of Qassem Soleimani, commander of Iran's Islamic Revolutionary Guard Corps (IRGC)’s extraterritorial Quds Force.  Iran made a decision to summon Brazil's charge d’affaires over comments about the death of the senior Iranian general. President Bolsonaro has repeatedly expressed his sympathy for Israel, Iran's archenemy.

In 2023 the government of President Luiz Inacio Lula da Silva allowed IRIS Makran and IRIS Dena to dock in the country. Although on February 3, the US Treasury Department's Office of Foreign Assets Control singled out Makran and Dena as Iranian properties for sanctions  to punish Iran's murderous drone industry.

Trade
Brazil remains Iran's main trading partner and exporter in Latin America with a total trade of $2.33 billion in 2011, up 5% from the previous year. Brazil's top exports to Iran include food, medication, minerals and automobiles. Petrobras has made substantial investments in the Iranian oil and gas sector in recent years. Iran was Brazil's largest export market for beef in 2011.

Nuclear energy
Brazil supports Iran's program to develop nuclear technology for peaceful purposes, though both countries have agreed to stop the proliferation of nuclear weapons. Brazil and Turkey agreed to a fuel-swap deal with Tehran during the G-15 Summit in May 2010 in a failed attempt to avoid further international sanctions against Iran.
Later in June 2010, Brazil voted against United Nations Security Council Resolution 1929.

Polls
According to the BBC, only 8% of Brazilians view Iran's influence positively, with 66% of Brazilians expressing a negative view. According to a 2012 Pew Global Attitudes Survey, 13% of Brazilians viewed Iran favorably, compared to 74% which viewed it unfavorably; 91% of Brazilians oppose Iranian acquisition of nuclear weapons and 62% approve of "tougher sanctions" on Iran, while 55% of Brazilians support use of military force to prevent Iran from developing nuclear weapons.

Diplomacy

Republic of Brazil
Tehran (Embassy)

Republic of Iran
Brasília (Embassy)

References

External links

Embassy of Brazil in Tehran Official website
Embassy of the Islamic Republic of Iran in Brasília Official website
Brazil-Iran relations American Enterprise Institute

 
Bilateral relations of Brazil
Brazil